Hussein Cabinet is either the name of two cabinets of Malaysia or two cabinets of Syria.

Malaysia 
Cabinet Hussein I (1976–1978)
Cabinet Hussein II (1978–1981)

Syria 

 First Hussein Arnous cabinet (2020–2021)
 Second Hussein Arnous cabinet (2021–present)